Dendrophryniscus berthalutzae is a species of toad in the family Bufonidae. It is endemic to southeastern Brazil where it is found in the coastal plain of Santa Catarina and Paraná states.

Etymology
The specific name berthalutzae honors Bertha Lutz, distinguished herpetologist from the National Museum of Brazil and pioneering feminist.

Description
The head is triangular. The tympanum is absent. The canthus rostralis is marked. The limbs are slender with reduced webbing. The dorsum is granulose with small, scattered tubercles. The coloration is cryptic; the scapular area has an X-mark. The belly is immaculate. The external margin of upper eyelid varies from weakly prominent to prominent.

Habitat and conservation
It occurs in leaf litter. It reproduces in bromeliads where the tadpoles develop. Dendrophryniscus berthalutzae is an uncommon species but continues to be collected on regular basis (notice though some specimens first reported as D. berthalutzae actually belong to Dendrophryniscus krausae described in 2008). It is threatened by habitat loss (deforestation).

References

berthalutzae
Endemic fauna of Brazil
Amphibians of Brazil
Taxa named by Eugênio Izecksohn
Amphibians described in 1994
Taxonomy articles created by Polbot